The 2011–12 All-Ireland Intermediate Club Hurling Championship was the eighth staging of the All-Ireland Intermediate Club Hurling Championship since its establishment by the Gaelic Athletic Association in 2004.

The All-Ireland final was played on 11 February 2012 at Croke Park in Dublin, between Mount Leinster Rangers from Carlow and Middletown Na Fianna from Armagh. Mount Leinster Rangers won the match by 1-13 to 1-11 to become the first Carlow club to claim an All-Ireland title.

Results

Leinster Intermediate Club Hurling Championship

Final

Munster Intermediate Club Hurling Championship

Quarter-finals

Semi-finals

Final

All-Ireland Intermediate Club Hurling Championship

Final

References

All-Ireland Intermediate Club Hurling Championship
All-Ireland Intermediate Club Hurling Championship
All-Ireland Intermediate Club Hurling Championship